Committee of Public Safety is an organization during the French Revolution.

Committee of Public Safety may also refer to:
 The Committee of Public Safety proclaimed by General Salan during the May 1958 crisis in Algeria
 Committee of Public Safety (1871), in France during the Paris Commune

See also
Committee of Safety (disambiguation), the name for several groups throughout history